Malcolm Mitchell Young (6 January 1953 – 18 November 2017) was an Australian musician who was the co-founder, rhythm guitarist, backing vocalist and songwriter of AC/DC. Except for a brief absence in 1988, he was with the band from its beginning in 1973 until retiring in 2014 due to health reasons. As a member of AC/DC, he was inducted into the Rock and Roll Hall of Fame in 2003.

Though his younger brother Angus was the more visible of the brothers, Malcolm was described as the driving force and the leader of the band. In 2014, Young stated that despite his retirement from the band, AC/DC was determined to continue making music with his blessing.

Young left AC/DC in mid-2014 to receive treatment for dementia. In September 2014, the band's management announced that he would be retiring permanently. He died from the effects of dementia on 18 November 2017.

Early life 
Young's father, William Young (1911–1985), lived with his family at 6 Skerryvore Road in the Cranhill district of Glasgow. William worked first as a wheel boy in a rope works and then as a machine and saw operator in an asbestos and cement business. In 1940, he joined the Royal Air Force and served in World War II as a flight engine mechanic. After the war, he worked as a yard man for a builder and then as a postman. He married Margaret (1913–1988; maiden name also Young), who was a housewife.

A TV advertisement shown in Scotland at that time offered assisted travel for families to start a different life in Australia. Fifteen members of the Young family left Scotland in late June 1963, including fifth son George (1946–2017) and younger brothers Malcolm and Angus (b. 1955). Also in tow were his eldest brother Stephen (1933–1989), his only sister Margaret Horsburgh (1935–2019) and brother William Jr (b. 1940). Another elder brother, Alex (1938–1997), who was a member of Tony Sheridan's backup group The Bobby Patrick Big Six, stayed in Europe and was later a member of London-based group Grapefruit. Another brother, John (b. 1937), had migrated to Australia separately.

Malcolm later detailed the family's musical background: "All the males in our family played, Stevie, the oldest played accordion, Alex and John were the first couple to play guitar, and being older it was sort of passed down to George, then myself, then Angus." Initially staying at Villawood Migrant Hostel (a site later turned into Villawood Immigration Detention Centre) in Nissen huts, George met and became friends with another migrant, Harry Vanda. The Young family then moved into a semi-detached house at 4 Burleigh Street in the Sydney suburb of Burwood.

Music career 

Both Angus and Malcolm Young were in a band with their brother George and his music partner Harry Vanda called Marcus Hook Roll Band. The project released an album in Australia called Tales of Old Grand Daddy. Malcolm Young played guitar on the 1974 release "Evie" by Stevie Wright, written and produced by Harry Vanda and George Young. The song is 11 minutes long and has three parts. Young played the guitar solo in Part One of the song. Malcolm Young was in a short lived Newcastle-based band The Velvet Underground (not the well-known 1960s band).

Malcolm Young was 20 when he and younger brother Angus formed AC/DC in 1973. Angus was on lead guitar, Malcolm on rhythm guitar, Colin Burgess on drums, Larry Van Kriedt on bass guitar and Dave Evans on vocals. "Can I Sit Next To You Girl," their first single, was later re-recorded with Bon Scott as their vocalist. They decided upon the name AC/DC after seeing the letters "AC/DC" on the back of their sister Margaret's sewing machine. In 1975 AC/DC had moved to Melbourne.

In early 1977 they returned to Britain and began a European tour with Black Sabbath. While Bon Scott and Ozzy Osbourne quickly became friends, some other members of the two bands did not get on so well. In one incident, Young alleged that Geezer Butler pulled a knife on him, although Butler has since refuted that.

Towards the end of 1977, bassist Mark Evans was fired; purportedly to find someone who could sing backup vocals with him. Evans described disagreement with Angus and Malcolm as a contributing factor. He was replaced by Cliff Williams.

In 1988, Young missed the majority of AC/DC's Blow Up Your Video World Tour to address alcohol abuse issues. He eventually became sober and returned to the band. During his absence he was replaced by his nephew, Stevie Young.

Playing guitar in AC/DC from 1973 until his last live gig with the band in June 2010, Malcolm Young toured the world with few breaks on a 37-year run with the band. He continued to write songs in AC/DC until his self-imposed departure from the band in 2014, being replaced once again by his nephew Stevie.

During production of their album Power Up, a source inside the band leaked that they were working with tracks that Malcolm recorded before his passing, recordings even going as far back as 2003.

History with Gretsch Guitars 
Malcolm Young owned and played several guitars throughout his career with AC/DC, however, he is most commonly known for his use of Gretsch guitars:
1963 Gretsch Jet Firebird – This is his very first Gretsch 6131 which became known as "The Beast". This guitar was heavily modified between 1976 and 1978, during this time, Malcolm removed the neck FilterTron and middle Gibson PAF, leaving only a rewound bridge FilterTron, the firebird red finish was removed and a matt clear lacquer was applied, he also removed the Burns vibrato unit and Space-Control bridge and installed a Badass wraparound bridge. Some time during 1988 during Malcolm's absence from the Blow Up Your Video tour, the guitar was refinished in a yellow lacquer and the Badass was replaced with a Schaller 455 wraparound bridge. In 1996 he removed the Schaller bridge and reinstalled a Burns vibrato and Space-Control bridge, the bridge pickup ring was also removed, The Beast has not been modified since.
1963 Gretsch Jet Firebird #2 – This guitar was used extensively over Malcolm's career as his number 2 guitar, this guitar, like The Beast, started life as a standard 1963 Jet Firebird finished in Firebird red, the finish was stripped and a clear satin lacquer was applied, a middle pickup cavity was also cut to accompany the removal of the neck pickup to mimic the number 1 guitar. Malcolm also rewired the guitar much simpler than The Beast, leaving only the bridge pickup and volume pot connected to the output jack. This guitar also has a Burns vibrato unit along with an Adjusto-Matic bridge. The guitar also features black hole plugs instead of silver as is seen on The Beast. Stevie Young presently has possession of this guitar as his number 1.
Gretsch Jet Firebird with Burns Vibrato, black, left-handed, year unknown - This guitar was rewired into a right-handed configuration similar to Malcolm's other guitars, with the neck pickup, pickup selector, and tone control removed. This guitar was given to Stevie Young, and was his main recording and stage guitar with Starfighters in the early 1980s. This guitar is currently his number 2 stage guitar with AC/DC.
JayDee Jet "White Arrow" – This guitar was made for Mal some time around 1977/78 and was seen most prominently during the Powerage and Highway to Hell tours. It was originally fitted with two FilterTron pickups and a wraparound bridge, however Malcolm later installed a Gibson tune-o-matic bridge and tailpiece, removed the neck pickup and filled the switch and wraparound bridge holes. Stevie Young also has possession of this guitar as his number 3.
1959 Gretsch White Falcon Project-o-Sonic – This guitar was used by Malcolm for Back in Black and For Those About to Rock, as well as respective tours. It featured a Cadillac G wire tailpiece and two FilterTron pickups. At some point after the For Those About to Rock tour, it was "fixed" by someone other than his guitar tech and it lost its signature sound. It was sold shortly after the For Those About to Rock tour and has changed hands several times, it is now owned by the Hard Rock Cafe.
Gibson L6S – Malcolm purchased this guitar in early 1975 while The Beast was getting repaired after a headstock break. It featured a natural finish, two humbucker pickups, a tune-o-matic bridge and tailpiece and a black pickguard. Upon AC/DC's arrival in the UK during 1976, it was modified to a double cut and had the neck pickup and pickguard removed. This guitar was used by Angus briefly as a backup, it was then given to Stevie Young in 1980 who sold it in 1982, before it resurfaced in 2015.

Illness and death 
At the conclusion of the Black Ice World Tour, Young was diagnosed with lung cancer. It was treated at an early stage, so surgery was successful and the cancer was removed. He also had an unspecified heart problem and had a pacemaker.

In April 2014, Young became seriously ill and was unable to continue performing. On 16 April 2014, AC/DC released a note stating that Young would be "taking a break from the band due to ill health". However, singer Brian Johnson stated that despite earlier reports, AC/DC are not retiring: "We are definitely getting together in May in Vancouver. We're going to pick up guitars, have a plonk and see if anybody has got any tunes or ideas. If anything happens we'll record it." In July, Johnson revealed that Young was in hospital receiving treatment for an unspecified condition and during May recording sessions had been replaced in the studio by guitarist Stevie Young, his nephew. On 24 September 2014, the band's management announced that Young was officially retiring and would not be rejoining AC/DC. Stevie Young continued to fill in for Malcolm on the band's 2015 Rock or Bust World Tour and eventually became his full-time replacement.

On 26 September 2014, The Sydney Morning Herald reported that Young had been diagnosed with dementia and had been admitted to a nursing home where he could receive full-time care. A source close to Young was quoted in this article as saying that he had "complete loss of short-term memory". Young's family confirmed four days later that he had dementia, saying that Young "is suffering from dementia and the family thanks you for respecting their privacy".

In subsequent interviews, Angus stated that his brother had been experiencing lapses in memory and concentration before the Black Ice project and had been receiving treatment during the Black Ice World Tour which ended in 2010. Angus confirmed that although his brother did not play on the 2014 Rock or Bust album: "He still likes his music. We make sure he has his Chuck Berry, a little Buddy Holly." He added that AC/DC would continue according to his brother's wishes and standards: "Look, even with his health, Malcolm was touring until he couldn't do it anymore." In that same interview, Angus stated that Young was rehearsing AC/DC's songs repeatedly before every concert just to remember how they went.

In an interview with Guitar Player about Young's songwriting credits in Rock or Bust, Angus stated:

Young died from the disease on 18 November 2017 at the age of 64, at Lulworth House in Elizabeth Bay. His funeral was held at St Mary's Cathedral, Sydney, on 28 November. Young's elder brother George died a few weeks before him, on 22 October 2017.

Legacy and influence 

Influenced by 1950s rock and roll and blues-based rock guitarists of the 1960s and 1970s, Young was regarded as a leading rock exponent of rhythm guitar.

Guitar Player magazine has stated that the secret to Young's guitar technique was playing open chords through a series of Marshall amplifiers, set to low volume without high gain. This is contrary to a common belief of many rock guitarists that rhythm guitar should involve loud and overdriven power chords.

Dave Mustaine of Megadeth stated in a 2004 interview that he considered himself, Young, Rudolf Schenker of The Scorpions, and James Hetfield of Metallica to be the best rhythm guitarists in the world.

In 2006, he was the subject of a song (and album) title by Australian punk rock band Frenzal Rhomb: "Forever Malcolm Young".

In 2017, Gretsch guitars reissued the Gretsch G6131MY, a signature guitar based on Young's modified 1963 Gretsch Jet Firebird.

On the day of Young’s passing, several of the biggest names in rock and metal sent out tributes to Young, including Eddie Van Halen, Ozzy Osbourne, Black Sabbath, Lars Ulrich of Metallica, Guns N’ Roses, Dave Mustaine of Megadeth, Billy Idol, Paul Stanley of Kiss, Joe Walsh, Joe Satriani, Def Leppard, Scott Ian of Anthrax, Foo Fighters, Alice Cooper, and Vince Neil and Nikki Sixx of Mötley Crüe and many more. Many of these artists covered an AC/DC song at their concerts on the day of or around the time of Young’s passing as part of their tribute.

Awards and nominations

APRA Awards
The APRA Awards are presented annually from 1982 by the Australasian Performing Right Association (APRA), "honouring composers and songwriters". They commenced in 1982.

|-
| 1995 || "Big Gun" –  Angus Young, Malcolm Young || Most Played Australian Work Overseas || 
|-
| 2001 || "It's a Long Way to the Top (If You Wanna Rock 'n' Roll)" –  Bon Scott, Angus Young, Malcolm Young || Ten Best Australian Songs || 
|-
| 2006 || "Highway to Hell" –  Bon Scott, Angus Young, Malcolm Young || Most Played Australian Work Overseas || 
|-
| 2007 || "Highway to Hell" –  Bon Scott, Angus Young, Malcolm Young || Most Played Australian Work Overseas || 
|-
| 2009 || "Highway to Hell" –  Bon Scott, Angus Young, Malcolm Young || Most Played Australian Work Overseas || 
|-
| rowspan="2"| 2010 || "Rock 'n' Roll Train" –  Angus Young, Malcolm Young || Most Played Australian Work Overseas || 
|-
| Angus Young, Malcolm Young || Songwriters of the Year || 
|-
| 2011 || "Highway to Hell" –  Bon Scott, Angus Young, Malcolm Young || Most Played Australian Work Overseas || 
|-
| rowspan="2"| 2015 || "Play Ball"  - Angus Young, Malcolm Young || Song of the Year || 
|-
| "Rock or Bust"  - Angus Young, Malcolm Young || Song of the Year || 
|-
| rowspan="2"| 2022 || "Shot in the Dark" || Most Performed Rock Work || 
|-
| "Realize" - Angus Young, Malcolm Young || Song of the Year ||

References

External links 

ACDC.com official website

1953 births
2017 deaths
20th-century Australian musicians
21st-century Australian musicians
AC/DC members
APRA Award winners
Australian heavy metal guitarists
Australian multi-instrumentalists
Australian rock guitarists
Australian songwriters
Deaths from dementia in Australia
Australian male guitarists
Australian people of Scottish descent
Musicians from Sydney
Musicians from Glasgow
Naturalised citizens of Australia
People from Cranhill
Rhythm guitarists
Scottish emigrants to Australia
Writers from Sydney
Malcolm
People educated at Ashfield Boys' High School
Marcus Hook Roll Band members
Blues rock musicians